Joseph Wauters (19 February 1906 – 8 August 1975) was a Belgian racing cyclist. He won the Belgian national road race title in 1929 and 1930.

References

External links

1906 births
1975 deaths
Belgian male cyclists
People from Beersel
Cyclists from Flemish Brabant